The 2002 Grozny OMON ambush occurred on April 18, 2002, when Chechen insurgents killed about 8 and wounded two republican OMON special police officers.

The ambush occurred just 90 meters from Chechnya's main police headquarters. The first bus in a convoy hit a remote controlled mine, and the militants then opened fire on the line of vehicles from the ruins of a nearby high-rise building. 

Another version of the attack was presented by Nezavisimaya Gazeta, which claimed there were two connected attacks.

The incident preceded by two hours President Vladimir Putin's mid-term state-of-the-nation address, in which he said the "military phase" of the Chechen conflict had been completed.

References

External links
Mine Leaves 21 OMON Troops Dead, The St. Petersburg Times, April 19, 2002

21st-century mass murder in Russia
Grozny
Grozny
Battles involving Chechnya
History of Grozny
Terrorist incidents in Russia in 2002
April 2002 events in Russia
Ambushes in Europe